The Copper Kings were the three industrialists Marcus Daly, William A. Clark, and F. Augustus Heinze. They were known for the epic battles fought in Butte, Montana, and the surrounding region, during the Gilded Age, over control of the local copper mining industry, the fight that had ramifications for not only Montana, but the United States as a whole.

The battles between Clark, Daly, and Heinze, and later between just Heinze and industrialist financiers William Rockefeller and Henry H. Rogers are a large chapter in Montana history. Eventually, Daly’s original company, known as Anaconda Copper emerged as a monopoly, expanding into the fourth largest company in the world by the late 1920s.

History

While the cost of smelting the complex copper-bearing ore was high, after the American Civil War, investors like William Andrews Clark and Andrew Jackson Davis began to develop Butte's mines and erect mills to extract the silver and gold. The riches in the hills made Davis Montana's first millionaire.

By 1876, Butte had become a prosperous silver camp with over 1,000 inhabitants. Marcus Daly arrived that year representing the Walker brothers, entrepreneurs from Salt Lake City. His mission was to inspect the Alice Mine for possible purchase by the brothers. Daly purchased the mine and successfully managed it for the Walkers. The town of Walkerville, which still overlooks the city of Butte, sprang up around the mine and other mines in the area.

In 1880, Daly sold his interest in the Walkers' properties and bought the Anaconda Mine. He did so with investment money from several San Francisco capitalists, including James Ben Ali Haggin,  Lloyd Tevis, and George Hearst (the father of media mogul William Randolph Hearst).  The area attracted other investors from Denver and points east. It wasn't long before capitalists from New York City and Boston bought into the huge potential of the area.

During the 1880s, copper mining came into the forefront and Butte became the world's greatest copper producer. The Utah and Northern Railway came to the area in 1881.

It wasn't long before Butte began to pay a price for the riches. The air filled with toxic sulfurous smoke. Daly responded by building a giant smelter in Anaconda, just 30 miles west of Butte. To this day, the giant smokestack remains a landmark. Shortly after Daly built the smelter, the Boston and Montana Co., with holdings second only to Daly's, built one in Great Falls. After complications with the Great Northern, Daly built his own railroad to transport ore from his mines to the smelter. Trains carried the ore from Butte's mines to both smelters.

Clark also yearned to be a statesman and used his newspaper, the Butte Miner, to push his political ambitions. He became a hero in Helena, Montana, by campaigning for its election as the state capital instead of Anaconda. Clark's long-standing dream of becoming a United States senator resulted in scandal in 1899, when it was revealed that he bribed members of the Montana State Legislature in return for their votes. At the time, U.S. Senators were chosen by their respective state legislators. The U.S. Senate refused to seat Clark because of the 1899 bribery scheme, but a later Senate campaign was successful, and he served a single, undistinguished term from 1901 until 1907.

In 1899, Daly teamed up with two principals of John D. Rockefeller's Standard Oil, William Rockefeller and Henry H. Rogers to create the giant Amalgamated Copper Mining Co., one of the largest trusts of the early Twentieth Century. (Neither Standard Oil nor John D. Rockefeller were directly involved). To stir the mix, another Copper King, F. Augustus Heinze, fought the dominance of Amalgamated, providing excitement to an already interesting chapter in Montana's legal history.

Marcus Daly died in 1900. John D. Ryan, a local banker, became close to Margaret Daly after her husband's death, and finally convinced Heinze to sell out, creating the monopoly Amalgamated sought. By 1910, it had changed its name to the Anaconda Copper Mining Company swallowing several smaller mining companies along the way. The Company dominated Butte for the next 74 years.

References 
The Battle for Butte, by Michael P. Malone.  2006 ed.  Seattle: University of Washington Press, 2006. 
The Wealthy 100:  From Benjamin Franklin to Bill Gates- A Ranking of the Richest Americans, Past and Present, by Michael Klepper and Robert Gunther.  Secaucus, N.J. : Carol Pub. Group, 1996.  
The War of the Copper Kings, by C.B. Glasscock.  Helena, MT:  Riverbend Publications, 2002.

External links
The Copper King Mansion
Butte

Pre-statehood history of Montana
Kings
Butte, Montana